The following is a list of tourist attractions on the Isle of Wight.

See also 

 List of beaches of the Isle of Wight

Tourist attractions
Isle of Wight